Hochkar (1,808 m) is a mountain and a ski area located  from Vienna. Located near the small resort of Göstling an der Ybbs on the Steiermark and Lower Austria border, it is popular among skiers who want to leave Vienna for a day, being about a two-hour drive away.

Ski and snowboard facilities 
The mountain has one detachable quad lift, four normal quad lifts (three with conveyors), one double chairlift and three towlifts, one of which is for children.

Summer activities
The area's lifts are open in the summer for sightseeing, hiking, or mountain biking. Tours are given, only in summer, of the  Hochkar Cave.

References

External links
 Official website - DE, EN, HU, CZ
 Hochkar Cave page

Mountains of the Alps
Mountains of Upper Austria
Ski areas and resorts in Austria
Geography of Lower Austria
Tourist attractions in Lower Austria